Blues for Duke is an album by saxophonist Sonny Stitt featuring selections associated with Duke Ellington recorded in 1975 and released on the Muse label in 1978.

Reception

Scott Yanow, in his review for AllMusic, stated "The rhythm section (pianist Barry Harris, bassist Sam Jones and drummer Billy Higgins) is excellent, and although the results are somewhat predictable (with "C Jam Blues" and "Perdido" being the high points), the music on this LP can be enjoyed by bop fans".

Track listing 
 "C Jam Blues" (Duke Ellington) - 6:07  
 "I Got It Bad (and That Ain't Good)" (Ellington, Paul Francis Webster) - 7:58  
 "Perdido" (Juan Tizol, Ervin Drake, Hans Lengsfelder) - 4:45  
 "Blues for Duke" (Sonny Stitt) - 6:59  
 "Don't Get Around Much Anymore" (Ellington, Bob Russell) - 3:45  
 "Satin Doll" (Ellington, Billy Strayhorn, Johnny Mercer) - 7:43

Personnel 
Sonny Stitt - alto saxophone, tenor saxophone
Barry Harris - piano
Sam Jones - bass 
Billy Higgins - drums

References 

1978 albums
Muse Records albums
Sonny Stitt albums
Duke Ellington tribute albums